Doku Gapurovich Zavgayev (born 22 December 1940, Beno-Yurt, Chechnya) is a Soviet and Russian statesman and politician. He was the leader of the Checheno-Ingush ASSR and later an ambassador of Russia to the republic of Slovenia. He is of the teip Gendargenoy.

Communist leader
In 1989, Zavgayev, a former collective farm manager and senior Communist Party official, was elected as the first Chechen First Secretary of the Checheno-Ingush ASSR since the Chechens' return in 1957.

In August 1991 Zavgayev, then communist leader of the Checheno-Ingush ASSR, was accused of support for the failed Moscow putsch against Soviet President Mikhail Gorbachev.

Taking advantage of the Soviet Union's collapse, Dzhokhar Dudayev and his militants acted against the legitimate government and Zavgayev's administration. On September 6, 1991, militants of the All-National Congress of Chechen People (NCChP), who mainly consisted of freed inmates from Chechen jails, headed by Dudayev, stormed a session of the Chechen-Ingush ASSR Supreme Soviet, killing the Soviet Communist Party chief for Grozny, Vitaly Kutsenko, severely injuring several other Soviet members, and effectively overthrowing the legitimate government of the Chechen-Ingush ASSR. Zavgayev, the Chairman of the Soviet, was not present. Trying to avoid further bloodshed he was compelled to leave the republic, publicly announcing that he would return.

Chechen war

By the spring of 1994 the atrocities and lawlessness in Chechnya have reached its toll. Both the president of Russia, Boris Yeltsin and the heads of the "force ministries" were convinced that Russia should actively intervene in Chechnya. Zavgayev was appointed a pro-Moscow head of state on 24 of October 1995, and was elected in December the same year with 96% of the votes.

On December 8, 1995, Zavgayev and Viktor Chernomyrdin signed an agreement as a basis for a Russian-Chechen federation treaty which would give Chechnya broad autonomy along the lines of the between Russia and Tatarstan.

Postwar career
After the 1996 withdrawal of the Russian forces from Chechnya, he was appointed Russia's ambassador in Tanzania. From February 2004 he was Deputy Foreign Minister and he was Director General of the Russian Ministry of Foreign Affairs from August 2004 to September 2009. From September 2009 to November 2019 he was Russia's ambassador in Slovenia.

Notes

1940 births
Living people
Ambassador Extraordinary and Plenipotentiary (Russian Federation)
Ambassadors of Russia to Slovenia
Ambassadors of Russia to Tanzania
Central Committee of the Communist Party of the Soviet Union members
Members of the Federation Council of Russia (1996–2000)
Members of the Supreme Soviet of Russia
Academic staff of the Moscow State Institute of International Relations
Heads of the Chechen Republic
Leaders ousted by a coup
People of the Chechen wars
Recipients of the Order "For Merit to the Fatherland", 3rd class
Recipients of the Order "For Merit to the Fatherland", 4th class
Recipients of the Order of Honour (Russia)
Recipients of the Order of the Red Banner of Labour
Chechen people
Chechen politicians
Russian people of Chechen descent
Soviet politicians